Manuel Martínez Núñez (born 12 September 1954) is a Spanish professor and politician from Galicia Sempre and former  ex-president of Suplusa.

References

1954 births
Living people
Politicians from Galicia (Spain)